was the founder of a collateral branch of the Japanese imperial family.

Early life
Prince Kitashirakawa Satonari was born in Kyoto, and was the thirteenth son of Prince Fushimi Kuniie (1802–1872), the twentieth head of the Fushimi-no-miya, the oldest of the four branches of the imperial dynasty allowed to provide a successor to the Chrysanthemum throne should the main imperial house fail to produce an heir. In 1860, he was adopted by Emperor Kōmei as a potential heir to the throne.

As he was born when the country was still under rule by the Tokugawa Bakufu, he was sent into the Buddhist priesthood in 1866, and assigned to serve at the monzeki temple of Shogo-in in Kyoto. He returned to secular life in 1867 during the Meiji Restoration, and Emperor Meiji authorized him to start a new princely house (ōke), Kitashirakawa-no-miya, in 1873.

However, Prince Kitashirakawa Satonari died within the same year, and, as he was without heirs, the Kitashirakawa-no-miya title passed to his elder half-brother, Yoshihisa-ō.

References
 Jansen, Marius B. (2000). The Making of Modern Japan. Cambridge: Harvard University Press. ; OCLC 44090600
 Keene, Donald. (2002). Emperor of Japan: Meiji and His World, 1852-1912. New York: Columbia University Press. ; OCLC 46731178
 Lebra, Sugiyama Takie. Above the Clouds: Status Culture of the Modern Japanese Nobility. University of California Press (1995). 

1850 births
1872 deaths
Kitashirakawa-no-miya
Japanese princes
People from Kyoto
People of Meiji-period Japan
Royalty and nobility who died as children